July is Marissa Nadler's sixth full-length studio album, released in the UK on February 10, 2014, on Bella Union and in North America on Sacred Bones Records. The album was recorded at Seattle's Avast Studios and produced by Randall Dunn. Meeting with a largely positive reception, it debuted at No. 16 on the Billboard Folk Albums chart and No. 14 on the Billboard Top Heatseekers Albums chart. PopMatters called the album a "triumph" and "one of 2014's best albums so far," while Spin called it a "masterfully composed release". Noisey wrote that "the darkly lit July is a moody trip through heat spells and night drives... Nadler's quiet songwriting and ethereal sound give July a sound that's, at times, almost sinister."

Production and release
Like Nadler's previous work, the album is acoustic and blends genres such as indie folk and dream pop, with Nadler writing the songs, singing and playing guitar. According to Nadler, the ideal situations for listening to the album might be "driving on a Nebraska highway" or "some lonely, drunken New York City evening by candlelight." Beyond Nadler, the album also featured a number of guest artists who recorded instrumentals at Avast Studios in 2013. Phil Wandscher also played guitar, with Jason Kardong on pedal steel guitar. Eyvind Kang contributed strings and string arrangements, while Steve Moore of the band Earth contributed keyboards.

The first single from the album, "Dead City Emily," was released in November 2013.

Reception

Critical reception

July has received mostly positive feedback from music critics. At Metacritic, the album received a Metascore of 83, based on 25 reviews, indicating "universal acclaim." The album received an exact score of 4 out of 5 from the majority of music publications, including AllMusic, MusicOMH, NME, Drowned in Sound, Fact,
Blurt and PopMatters, with Pitchfork breaking the trend by awarding the album 8.1 out of 10.

In a positive review, PopMatters called the album a "triumph" and "one of 2014's best albums so far," while Spin included the album on its list of "The Best Overlooked Albums of 2014 So Far," calling it a "masterfully composed release".

About the atmosphere of the album, Vice Media's Noisey website wrote that "the darkly lit July is a moody trip through heat spells and night drives... Nadler’s quiet songwriting and ethereal sound give July a sound that's, at times, almost sinister". Noisey further wrote that "her spectral voice earns comparisons to a siren" and the production "adds deadliness to her sound". Steven Rosen of Blurt wrote that Nadler manages to achieve an "almost-hallucinatory effect out of her singing, often multi-tracking the voice to create a ghostly pillowing effect. The production by Randall Dunn highlights this, choosing instruments – strings, synths, piano, pedal steel, Nadler’s own reflective acoustic and 12-string guitar – that create a sanctuary, a safe haven, for her to sing these 11 measured, stately compositions".

Singles
The first single from the album, "Dead City Emily," was positively received by Stereogum as an “ethereal spine-tingler” and by BrooklynVegan as “a track as haunting and delicate as any of her best tracks to date.”

Chart performance
July debuted at No. 16 on the Billboard Folk Albums chart and No. 14 on the Billboard Top Heatseekers Albums chart.

Track listing

Personnel
Marissa Nadler - vocals, guitar
Phil Wandscher - guitar
Jonas Haskins - bass
Pat Schowe - drums
Jason Kardong - pedal steel guitar
Steve Moore - keyboards
Eyvind Kang - strings/arrangements

References

External links
Marissa Nadler Official Site

2014 albums
Marissa Nadler albums
Bella Union albums
Sacred Bones Records albums